Bayble is a large village in Point (An Rubha), on the Isle of Lewis,  east of Stornoway. Bayble is also within the parish of Stornoway.

There are around 400 people living in Bayble. It is separated into Upper and Lower Bayble by a burn at the bottom of the valley. Upper Bayble had a community shop, Murdo's, which has now closed after 44 years of service. Upper Bayble has produced three internationally recognised writers of poetry and prose, Iain Crichton Smith, Derick Thomson and Anne Frater. The former writing predominantly in English and the latter two writing almost exclusively in Gaelic. Lower Bayble is a seaside crofting township. The village overlooks Bayble Bay (Bàgh Phabail), with Bayble Island (Eilean Phabail) at the south end and Eilean a' Chàise to the north.

References

External links

Canmore - Lewis, Lower Bayble site record
Canmore - Lewis, Lower Bayble, Clach Stein site record
Canmore - Lewis, Lower Bayble, Loch An Duin site record

Villages in the Isle of Lewis